Ángel Algobia Esteves (born 23 June 1999) is a Spanish professional footballer who plays as a midfielder for Getafe CF.

Club career
Born in Velilla de San Antonio, Community of Madrid, Algobia joined Rayo Vallecano's youth setup in 2008, aged nine. He left in 2014 and joined Alcobendas CF, but returned to Rayo in the following year.

Algobia made his senior debut with Rayo's reserves on 26 August 2018, starting in a 2–1 Tercera División home win over CD San Fernando de Henares. He scored his first goal as a senior on 21 October, netting the opener in a 3–3 away draw against CF San Agustín del Guadalix, and finished the campaign as an undisputed starter.

Algobia left Rayo on 13 August 2020, and moved to Getafe CF five days later, being assigned to the B-team in Segunda División B. He made his first team debut with the latter on 30 November 2021, starting in a 5–1 away routing of CFJ Mollerussa, for the season's Copa del Rey.

On 11 August 2022, after impressing manager Quique Sánchez Flores during the pre-season, Algobia signed a professional contract and was definitely promoted to the main squad in La Liga. He made his first team debut on 11 September, starting in a 2–1 home win over Real Sociedad.

References

External links

1999 births
Living people
Spanish footballers
Footballers from the Community of Madrid
Association football midfielders
La Liga players
Segunda División B players
Tercera División players
Tercera Federación players
Rayo Vallecano B players
Getafe CF B players
Getafe CF footballers